Henri Oscar Rocheleau (1876-1956) was an American law enforcement officer and politician who served as twenty first Sheriff  of Worcester County, Massachusetts.

References

 

Sheriffs of Worcester County, Massachusetts
1876 births
1956 deaths